Gold Tour can be the name of two tours
Gold Tour (Steps)
Gold Tour (Prince)